Josef Budenz (Hungarian: József Budenz) (13 June 1836–15 April 1892) was a German comparative linguist specializing in Finno-Ugric who researched the origins of the Hungarian language.

Early life and education 
József Budenz  graduated from high school in Fulda in 1854 and studied in Marburg and from 1855 for three years in Göttingen, among others with Theodor Benfey with a focus on Indo-European comparative linguistics. He received his doctorate in 1858.

Career 

In 1858 he was in Budapest and taught in Székesfehérvár. In 1861 he was appointed librarian of the Hungarian Academy of Sciences. From 1868 he was a full professor of Altaic comparative linguistics, the chair having been established especially for him. In 1871 he became a full member of the Hungarian Academy of Sciences. On 17 March 1884, he was honored in the university auditorium. From 1876 he was a corresponding member of the Russian Academy of Sciences in St. Petersburg.

Origins of Hungarian 

Today, the consensus among linguists is that Hungarian is a member of the Uralic family of languages.

The classification of Hungarian as a Uralic/Finno-Ugric rather than a Turkic language was a matter of impassioned political controversy throughout the 18th and into the 19th centuries. During the latter half of the 19th century, a competing hypothesis proposed a Turkic affinity of Hungarian, or, alternatively, that both the Uralic and the Turkic families formed part of a superfamily of Ural–Altaic languages. 

The debate came to a head in the 1880s between the two camps, known as the Ugric-Turkic war. One camp proposed that Hungarians were related to Turanians, supported by Arminius Vambery who wrote a book on the topic and was a friend of Budenz.  Budenz attacked Vambery's book in a lecture at the Hungarian Academy, and challenged his methods as unscientific. Vambery struck back with his own accusations against his friend.  After things settled, the Finno-Ugric hypothesis was concluded the sounder of the two, mainly based on work by Budenz.

Death 

Budenz died in Budapest on 15 April 1892, and was buried on 17 April 1892.

Memorials and retrospectives 

On 27 May 1963, a memorial plaque was dedicated in his honor at the house where he was born, currently in use as the town hall of the village where he formerly attended school in Rasdorf. The commemorative plaque bears the inscription: "Here stood until 1954 the house in which on 13 June 1836 Joseph Budenz was born. He was a professor at the University of Budapest from 1868 until his death on 15 April 1892, and is the founder of modern Finno-Ugric comparative linguistics. Donated by the Societas Uralo-Altaica on May 23, 1963."

The Fuldaer Geschichtsblätter also published an article about him in 1936 on the centenary of his birth.

The Budenz Gymnasium in Budapest published a Budenz memorial book in Hungarian in 2002. A "Budenz Day" is held every year at the Finno-Ugrian Seminar of the University of Göttingen.

Works 

 
 Übersicht der Verzweigung der ugrischen Sprachen, 1878

See also 

 Comb Ceramic culture
 Estonian language
 Finnic languages
 Finnish language
 Finno-Permic languages
 Indo-Uralic languages
 Old Hungarian script
 Old Permic script
 Pre-Finno-Ugric substrate
 Proto-Finnic language
 Proto-Uralic homeland hypotheses
 Proto-Uralic language
 Samoyedic languages
 Turanism
 Ural-Altaic languages
 Uralic languages
 Uralic–Yukaghir languages
 Uralo-Siberian languages
 Uralo-Siberian languages
 Volga Finns

References 
Notes

Citations

Further reading

External links 

 Jozsef Budenz  in the Hungarian Biography Lexicon (in Hungarian)

1836 births
1892 deaths
19th-century linguists
Finno-Ugrists
Hungarian-German people
German librarians
Linguists from Germany
Linguists of Hungarian
Members of the Hungarian Academy of Sciences